Mohamed Bacha (born 24 March 1967) is an Algerian football manager.

References

1967 births
Living people
Algerian football managers
USM Blida managers
NC Magra managers
AS Khroub managers
Algerian Ligue Professionnelle 1 managers
21st-century Algerian people